Edward Beseley (by 1532 – 1613 or later), of York and Skelton in Overton, Yorkshire, was an English politician.

He was a Member (MP) of the Parliament of England for Ripon in October 1553, for Thirsk in November 1554 and for Scarborough in 1558.

References

17th-century deaths
Politicians from York
Year of birth uncertain
English MPs 1553 (Mary I)
English MPs 1554–1555
English MPs 1558
Members of the Parliament of England for constituencies in Yorkshire